The Middlebury Language Schools are language schools administered by Middlebury College. The programs comprise undergraduate and graduate instruction in 13 languages during two-, six-, seven-, or eight-week summer sessions. The Schools enroll approximately 1,500 students every summer. The pedagogical approach of the programs relies on immersion-based instruction and acquisition. All students in the Language Schools must sign and abide by Middlebury College's "Language Pledge", a pledge to use their target language exclusively during the duration of their time at the School. 

Undergraduate instruction is offered in Abenaki, Arabic, Chinese, English, French, German, Hebrew, Italian, Japanese, Korean, Portuguese, Russian, and Spanish. Additionally, graduate-level instruction is offered in Arabic, Chinese, French, German, Hebrew, Italian, Japanese, Korean, Russian, and Spanish. The Language Schools also offer a Doctor of Modern Languages (D.M.L.) degree, currently unique to Middlebury. Middlebury announced that it will launch a pilot School of Abenaki in 2020; the first accredited session occurred Summer 2021. Students are ages 18 to 80+ from all parts of the world. Enrolled students should be high school graduates.

Founding and expansion
In 1915, the School of German was founded as the first of Middlebury Language Schools.  The most recent School, the English Language School, will be established in 2022.

Middlebury Language Schools have historically all been conducted at the College's campus in Middlebury, Vermont. In Summer 2009 the College opened a satellite campus at Mills College in Oakland, California, to accommodate growth in the enrollments in several of the schools. In Summer 2020, Middlebury will no longer operate on Mills College but will instead operate at Bennington College in Bennington, Vermont. The English Language School will be located in Monterey, California at the Middlebury Institute of International Studies.

Language instruction

All of the thirteen Middlebury Language Schools use an immersion-based approach to language instruction and acquisition. The Schools also stress cultural instruction in addition to pure language instruction. Students in all of the Language Schools are required to sign the "Language Pledge." The Pledge, which has been in continuous use since the 1920s and is a registered trademark of Middlebury College, reads:

In signing this Language Pledge, I agree to use __ as my only language of communication while attending the Middlebury Language Schools. I understand that failure to comply with this Pledge may result in my expulsion from the School without credit or refund.

The focus on immersion learning and the exclusive use of the target language allows the Schools to offer the equivalent of a year of language instruction in either six-, seven-, or eight-week summer sessions.

Graduate study

Ten of Middlebury's summer schools – Arabic, Chinese, French, German, Hebrew, Italian, Japanese, Korean, Russian, and Spanish – offer graduate programs in addition to the undergraduate component. These are completed over four six-week summer sessions (over a ten-year period) or with an option of combining the summer sessions with an academic year abroad (Italy, France, Germany, Spain, or Russia) or online, depending on the language. The graduate degree most often conferred is the Master of Arts, but Middlebury also has a Master of Arts in Applied Languages. The MA in French, German, Italian, and Spanish require one summer on the Middlebury campus. A second summer is required for the MA in Arabic, Chinese, Hebrew, Japanese, Korean, and Russian.

Doctor of Modern Languages (D.M.L.)

Middlebury offers a Doctor of Modern Languages (D.M.L.) degree. Unique to Middlebury, the D.M.L. prepares teacher-scholars in two modern foreign languages, helping them develop as teachers of second-language acquisition, literature, linguistics, and language pedagogy.

See also
Language school

References

External links
 Middlebury Language Schools

Language schools in the United States
Educational institutions established in 1915
Education in Addison County, Vermont
Middlebury College
1915 establishments in Vermont